Chase the Clouds is the debut and only studio album by American singer Keedy, released through Arista Records on March 12, 1991. The album includes the singles "Save Some Love" and "Wishing on the Same Star". "Save Some Love" peaked at No. 15 on the Billboard Hot 100 chart, while "Wishing on the Same Star" charted at No. 86. "Wishing on the Same Star" was later covered in Spanish by Puerto Rican singer Chayanne as "Mi Primer Amor" in 1992, Australian pop group Girlfriend in 1994, American singer Judy Cheeks in 1996, and Japanese singer Namie Amuro in 2002.

Track listing

Personnel 
 Keedy – lead and harmony vocals, backing vocals (2, 3, 5, 6, 8)
 Claude Gaudette – keyboards, arrangements (1), keyboard programming (2), drum programming (2), additional drum programming (3)
 Greg Gerard – keyboards, arrangements, keyboard programming (2), drum programming (2), guitars (2), backing vocals (6)
 Teddy Castellucci – guitars (1)
 Michael Thompson – guitars (2, 4)
 James Harrah – guitars (3, 5, 6, 8, 10)
 Mark Leggett – guitars (7)
 Jimmy Johnson – bass (4, 5)
 Randy Jackson – bass (6)
 Michael Jay – drum programming (1, 4, 7, 9), arrangements (1, 4, 7, 9)
 Kevin Gilbert – drum programming (3, 5, 6, 8, 10)
 Pat Mastelotto – drums (3, 5, 6, 8, 10)
 Paulinho da Costa – percussion (4, 7)
 R.U. Kidding – kazoo (1)
 Guy Roche – arrangements (2)
 Chris Gerard – backing vocals (3, 5, 6, 8, 10)
 Sara Gerard – backing vocals (8)
 Lauren Superstein – backing vocals (9)

Production 
 Producers – Claude Gaudette (Tracks 1, 2 & 3); Greg Gerard (All Tracks); Michael Jay (Tracks 1, 4, 7 & 9); Brian Malouf (Tracks 5, 6, 8 & 10).
 A&R – Michael Cohen
 Executive Producer on Track 2 – Brian Malouf
 Production Coordinator on Tracks 1, 4, 7 & 9 – Lauren Superstein
 Engineers – Michael McDonald (Tracks 1, 4, 7 & 9); Patrick MacDougall (Tracks 2, 3, 5, 6, 8 & 10); Frank Roszak (Track 2); Brian Malouf (Tracks 3, 5, 6, 8 & 10).
 Assistant Engineers – Patrick MacDougall (Tracks 1, 4, 7 & 9); John Jackson (Tracks 2, 3, 5, 6, 8 & 10); Lawrence Fried (Tracks 3, 5, 6, 8 & 10)
 Additional Engineer on Track 8 – Bill Gerard
 Recorded at The Zoo (Encino, CA); 41B Studios (Westlake Village, CA); Can-Am Recorders (Tarzana, CA); Image Recording Studios (Los Angeles, CA); Trax Recording Studio (Hollywood, CA).
 Mixed by Brian Malouf at Ameraycan Studios (North Hollywood, CA) and Can-Am Recorders.
 Mastered by Stephen Marcussen at Precision Mastering (Hollywood, CA).
 Art Direction and Design – Elisa Marshall
 Photography – Randee St. Nicholas

References

External links
 
 

1991 debut albums
Arista Records albums